Thomas N. Byrne (7 November 1917 – 16 March 1978) was an Irish independent politician. He was first elected to Dáil Éireann as a Teachta Dála (TD) for Dublin North-West at a by-election on 12 November 1952. The by-election was caused by the death of his brother, A. P. Byrne. He was re-elected at the 1954 and 1957 general elections. He lost his seat at the 1961 general election.

His father Alfie Byrne was an MP, TD, Senator and Lord Mayor of Dublin. Another brother Patrick Byrne was also a TD.

See also
Families in the Oireachtas

References

1917 births
1978 deaths
Independent TDs
Members of the 14th Dáil
Members of the 15th Dáil
Members of the 16th Dáil
Politicians from County Dublin